The Center for Individual Freedom (CFIF) is an Alexandria, Virginia based U.S. nonprofit conservative policy advocacy and astroturfing organization. It was founded in 1998 by former tobacco industry executives who sought to counter government restrictions on smoking.

The Center for Individual Freedom has led efforts to defeat efforts to compel "dark money" groups like it from being forced to reveal their donors. It won a big victory in September 2012 when a U.S. appeals court overturned a lower court decision that increased disclosure requirements. Despite this, Mother Jones reported in April 2012 that the Center for Individual Freedom had been given $2.75 million from Crossroads GPS, the conservative non-profit started by Karl Rove. Paul Ryan, an attorney with the Campaign Legal Center (a group in favor of campaign finance regulation), says CFIF's anti-disclosure cases are without merit but adds that challenging disclosure laws is a new attempt to deregulate campaign finance.

In the 2010 elections CFIF spent $2.5 million supporting Republican candidates, and in the 2012 elections it spent $1.9 million.

An investigation by Gizmodo found that CFIF was intimately involved in the communications industry's astroturfing campaign against net neutrality.

References

External links
 
 Organizational Profile – National Center for Charitable Statistics (Urban Institute)
 Reports Image Index
 2010 Outside Spending Summary at OpenSecrets.org

Lobbying firms